Boeraans is a dialect of Afrikaans which is one of the 11 official languages in South Africa, and is one of the youngest Germanic languages with official status and it is only spoken in South Africa.

Boeraans was also known as "Die Taal" (meaning "The Language). The Border Boers moved from the Western Cape to the Eastern Cape, and stayed there.

In 1820, the Boers moved to the region known as the Free State Province in South Africa and Transvaal (now the provinces of Limpopo, Mpumalanga, Gauteng and a part of North West) in South Africa.

References

External links 
Afrikaans